Oxyanthus tubiflorus, commonly called the needle flower, is a shrub in the family Rubiaceae. It is native to Sierra Leone, Guinea and probably neighboring Liberia. It is noteworthy for producing one of the skinniest flowers of any land (non-aquatic) plant, up to seven inches (17 centimeters) in length, while only 1/16th inch (1.5 millimeters) in width; a length to width ratio of 112 fold. The leaves are opposite and 3 to seven inches (7 to 17 centimeters) long by 1 to 3 inches (2.5 to 7.5 centimeters) wide. It is pollinated by a species of sphinx moth.

References 

tubiflorus
Flora of Sierra Leone
Flora of Guinea
Plants described in 1830
Taxa named by Henry Cranke Andrews